Brandberg may refer to:

Austria
Brandberg, Austria, a municipality in the district of Schwaz, Tyrol, Austria

Namibia
Brandberg Constituency, the former name of Dâures Constituency in the Erongo region of Namibia
Brandberg Massif, a dome-shaped plateau in the Namib Desert, Namibia
Brandberg Mountain, in the Brandberg Massif, Namibia

People
Björn Brandberg (born 1986), Swedish curler
Karl Gustaf Brandberg (1905–1997), Swedish Army lieutenant general
Paulina Brandberg